"Alma Redemptoris Mater" ("Loving Mother of our Redeemer") is a Marian hymn, written in Latin hexameter, and one of four seasonal liturgical Marian antiphons sung at the end of the office of Compline (the other three being Ave Regina Caelorum, Regina Caeli and Salve Regina).

History
Hermannus Contractus (also called Herman the Cripple; 1013–1054) is said to have authored the hymn based on the writings of Saints Fulgentius, Epiphanius, and Irenaeus of Lyon. It is mentioned in The Prioress's Tale, one of Geoffrey Chaucer's Canterbury Tales. Formerly it was recited at the end of the canonical hours only from the first Sunday in Advent until the Feast of the Purification (2 February). It was translated into English by John Henry Newman in "Tracts for the Times", No. 75 (Kindly Mother of the Redeemer).

Text

Latin 

Depending on the period, the following combinations of a versicle, response, and collect are added. From the first Sunday of Advent until Christmas Eve, the collect from the Fourth Sunday of Advent is used, and thereafter until the Feast of the Presentation, the collect from Solemnity of Mary, Mother of God, is used. 

The first collect (“Grátiam tuam quáesumus...”) is notably also used in Masses during Advent, and is exactly the same prayer that concludes the Angelus (another Marian devotion focused on the Incarnation).

From the first Sunday of Advent until Christmas Eve

From First Vespers of Christmas until the Presentation

English translation

From the first Sunday of Advent until Christmas Eve

From First Vespers of Christmas until the Presentation

American Liturgy of the Hours translation

Church Music Association of America translation

Translation of Edward Caswall (1814-1878) 

In The Divine Office (1974) this is hymn number 118 and it recommends singing it to the tune SONG I, by Orlando Gibbons (1583-1625). This tune has a metre 10.10.10.10.10.10. Since the last line of the text has 12 syllables the tune will need to be modified.

Musical settings 
Marc-Antoine Charpentier, 2 settings,  Alma Redemptoris Mater  H.21 (1675), for 2 voices and bc, Alma Redemptoris Mater H.44 (16 ?), for soloists, chorus, 2 violins and bc.

References 

Marian devotions
Roman Catholic prayers
Marian antiphons
Latin-language Christian hymns
Latin religious words and phrases